Nimra Bucha is a Pakistani actress who has appeared in variety of TV serials, films, web-series and has also worked in theatre. She played a role of Saadat Hassan Manto's muse in Sarmad Khoosat's Manto which earned her a nomination of Lux Style Awards for best supporting actress film.

Career 
She started her career from Traverse Theatre in 2006. Now she is acting in several television dramas on different channels. Her famous work includes Daam and Mera Yaqeen.

Filmography

Films

Television

Webseries

Accolades

References

External links 
 
 

Living people
Pakistani television actresses
Bard College alumni
Actresses from Karachi
21st-century Pakistani actresses
Year of birth missing (living people)